The VIII Central American Games (Spanish: VIII Juegos Deportivos Centroamericanos) was a multi-sport event that took place between 3 and 12 March 2006.

The games were initially scheduled between 9 and 18 December 2005 in Guatemala with support of El Salvador.  However, the damages caused by Hurricane Stan in October 2005 led to the resignment of the designated hosts.  Therefore, a minor and descentralized version of the games was organized with venues
distributed in all participating five countries with local opening ceremonies being the main took place in
Managua.  The games were opened by ORDECA president
Melitón Sánchez who was participating at Panama event.

The competition featured 19 sports which were contested at various
venues.  10 sports were cancelled.  El Salvador did not participate.
There was no torch run, no games motto, no
athletes village, no mascot.

Venues
 : athletics, baseball, bodybuilding, boxing.
 : basketball, fencing, softball, swimming, wrestling.
 : chess, racquetball, taekwondo, triathlon.
 : cycling, equestrian, shooting, weightlifting.
 : judo, table tennis.

Sports

Aquatic sports
 Swimming
 Athletics
 Baseball
 Basketball
 Bodybuilding
 Boxing
 Chess
 Cycling
 Equestrian
 Fencing
 Judo
 Racquetball
 Shooting
 Softball
 Table tennis
 Taekwondo
 Triathlon
 Weightlifting
 Wrestling

Medal table
There is no official medal table published by the organizers of the games.  The table below is published in at least two sources.  It is reported that a couple of medals were deprived retrospectively after protests from Costa Rica and Honduras.

References 

Central American Games
Central American Games
International sports competitions hosted by Nicaragua
International sports competitions hosted by Costa Rica
International sports competitions hosted by Guatemala
International sports competitions hosted by Honduras
International sports competitions hosted by Panama
Central American Games
Central American Games
Central American Games
Central American Games
Central American Games
2006 in Central American sport
Multi-sport events in Costa Rica
Multi-sport events in Guatemala
Multi-sport events in Honduras
Multi-sport events in Nicaragua
Multi-sport events in Panama